Imperialin (imperialine or peiminine) is an alkaloid found in the bulbs of species of the genus Fritillaria, where it occurs to the extent of 0.1 - 2.0%. In humans it may cause spasms, vomiting, hypotension and cardiac arrest.

Management 
Inducing vomiting and administering activated charcoal. Spasmolytics may be required.

References 

Quinolizidine alkaloids
Plant toxins